Finey (Dhivehi: ފިނޭ) is one of the inhabited islands of Haa Dhaalu Atoll administrative division and geographically part of Thiladhummathi Atoll in the north of the Maldives.

Geography

Demography

Economy
Haa Dhaal Finey is an agricultural cultivating yams, bananas and vegetables. Finey is one of the beautiful island in H Dh atoll as well as in Maldives. in earlier every island from H Dh atoll came finey to buy vegetable and fruits, and most commonly coconuts. they have very good farmers with large area to do farming.

References

Islands of the Maldives